Novar Wind Farm is a 50 turbine, 53.8 megawatt wind farm located in the Scottish Highlands. Constructed in 1997, Novar was of the earlier developments of Scottish on-shore wind generation. It provided a significant contribution to the local economy during construction and through its Community Benefit Fund. In 2010 an additional 16 turbines were constructed taking the yearly generation capacity to 53.8 megawatts.

Location 

The land is predominately heath land covered in heather but is also used for grazing for sheep. Gravel access roads were built to allow the construction and maintenance of the site.

Construction 
Novar A was built and commissioned by Npower (United Kingdom) in 1997 with x34 500 kW Bonus (Siemens) turbines being connected to National Grid (Great Britain). Between 1997 and 2010 ownership changed hands several times until Ventient Energy took it on.

In 2010, RWE began construction to expand the site with the addition of 16 larger 2,300 kW Enercon turbines. In September 2012, The Energy Minister for the Scottish Government, Fergus Ewing officially opened the new site. This increased the generating capacity from 17 megawatts to 53.8 megawatts.

Community Benefit Fund 
As with many wind farms in Scotland, a Community Benefit Fund was set up. The fund is a contract whereby the operator agrees to pay a fixed amount to local communities per MWh generated. In this case RWE Innogy who currently operate Novar Wind Farms have agreed to pay £2000 for every megawatt Novar generates.

The money is split between the local community councils of Kiltearn, Ardross, and Alness who then decide how the funds are spent. Often the funds go to local schools for items such as books and toys, or towards helping community groups with funding.

References

Wind farms
Renewable energy
Wind power in Scotland
Highlands and Islands of Scotland
Wind farms in the United Kingdom
Wind power
Electrical grid
Wind power in the European Union